Lillian Faderman (born July 18, 1940) is an American historian whose books on lesbian history and LGBT history have earned critical praise and awards. The New York Times named three of her books on its "Notable Books of the Year" list. In addition, The Guardian named her book, Odd Girls and Twilight Lovers, one of the Top 10 Books of Radical History. She was a professor of English at California State University, Fresno (Fresno State), which bestowed her emeritus status, and a visiting professor at University of California, Los Angeles (UCLA). She retired from academe in 2007. Faderman has been referred to as "the mother of lesbian history" for her groundbreaking research and writings on lesbian culture, literature, and history.

Early life
Faderman was raised by her mother, Mary, and her aunt, Rae. In 1914, her mother emigrated from a shtetl in Latvia to New York City, planning eventually to send for the rest of the family. Her aunt Rae came in 1923, but the rest of the family was killed during Hitler's extermination of European Jews, and Mary blamed herself for not being able to rescue them. Her guilt contributed to a serious mental illness that would profoundly affect her daughter.

Mary and Rae, Faderman's mother and aunt, worked in the garment industry for very little money. Lillian was her mother's third pregnancy; her mother (unmarried) aborted the first two pregnancies at Lillian's biological father's request, but insisted on bearing and raising the third. Mary married when Lillian was a teenager and died in 1979, continuing to have a profound influence on her daughter’s life.

Using pseudonyms such as Gigi Frost, Faderman did nude modeling and made softcore nude film loops which paid for her education. She gave her experience in the softcore porn industry in her memoir book Naked in the Promised Land.

Education
Faderman studied first at the University of California, Berkeley and later at UCLA.

Personal life
Her family moved with her to Los Angeles where, with her mother’s encouragement, Lillian took acting classes. She began modeling as a teenager, discovered the gay bar scene, and eventually met her first girlfriend. Before she graduated from Hollywood High School, she married a gay man much older than herself—a marriage that lasted less than a year.

Faderman came out as lesbian in the 1950s. She lives with her partner, Phyllis Irwin. She and Phyllis raised one son, Avrom, conceived through artificial insemination by an anonymous Jewish donor.

Awards and honors

 The New York Times (Notable Book of 1981) for Surpassing the Love of Men: Romantic Friendship and Love Between Women from the Renaissance to the Present
 Stonewall Book Award (1982) for Surpassing the Love of Men: Romantic Friendship and Love Between Women from the Renaissance to the Present
 Lambda Literary Award (Editor's Choice Award, 1992) for Odd Girls and Twilight Lovers: A History of Lesbian Life in Twentieth-Century America
 The New York Times (Notable Book of 1992) for Odd Girls and Twilight Lovers: A History of Lesbian Life in Twentieth-Century America
 Stonewall Book Award (Nonfiction, 1992) for Odd Girls and Twilight Lovers: A History of Lesbian Life in Twentieth-Century America
 Lambda Literary Award for Best Non-fiction Book (2000) for To Believe in Women: What Lesbians Have Done For America - A History
 Lambda Literary Award for Best Lesbian/Gay Anthology (2003) for Naked in the Promised Land
 Yale University James Brudner Prize for Exemplary Scholarship in Lesbian/Gay Studies (2001)
 Paul Monette-Roger Horwitz Trust Award (1999)
 Bill Whitehead Award for Lifetime Achievement (Publishing Triangle, 2004) for Naked in the Promised Land
 Judy Grahn Award for Memoir (Publishing Triangle, 2004) for Naked in the Promised Land
 Two Lambda Literary Awards for Best Nonfiction Book & LGBT Arts and Culture Award (2007) both awards for Gay L. A.: A History of Sexual Outlaws, Power Politics and Lipstick Lesbians
 Lambda Literary Award (Pioneer Award, 2013)
 The New York Times (Notable Book of 2015) for The Gay Revolution
 The Washington Post (Notable Nonfiction Book of 2015) for The Gay Revolution 
 Anisfield-Wolf Book Award (Nonfiction, 2016) for The Gay Revolution
 Golden Crown Literary Society 2017 Trailblazer Award

Works

References

External links
 Official website
 Award-winner Lillian Faderman 
 Interview with Lilian Faderman 
 C-Span Book TV
 Lillian Faderman

1940 births
Living people
21st-century American historians
21st-century American women writers
21st-century American memoirists
American women historians
Historians of LGBT topics
Historians of the United States
Jewish American historians
Lesbian academics
American lesbian writers
LGBT historians
LGBT Jews
Lesbian memoirists
American women memoirists
American people of Latvian-Jewish descent
LGBT people from New York (state)
Writers from Fresno, California
California State University, Fresno faculty
Lambda Literary Award winners
Stonewall Book Award winners
21st-century American Jews
Hollywood High School alumni
LGBT educators